Schmiechen (Schwab) is a railway station in the municipality of Schmiechen, located in the district of Aichach-Friedberg in Swabia, Germany.

References

Railway stations in Bavaria